The Arnihaaggen (2,216 m) is a mountain of the Emmental Alps in Switzerland. It lies to the east of the Brienzer Rothorn and to the west of the Höch Gumme. The small mountain lake of Eisee lies immediately to the north.

Administratively, the summit is located within the municipality of Giswil. The south summit (2,207 m) is shared between the municipalities of Giswil, to the north, Hofstetten bei Brienz, to the south-east, and Schwanden bei Brienz, to the south-west. Hofstetten bei Brienz and Schwanden bei Brienz are in the canton of Bern, whilst Giswil is in the canton of Obwalden.

References

External links
 Arnihaaggen on Hikr

Mountains of the Alps
Mountains of Switzerland
Mountains of the canton of Bern
Mountains of Obwalden
Emmental Alps
Two-thousanders of Switzerland